The 2020 Tahiti Championship competition is the 47th Tahitian domestic rugby union club competition operated by the Fédération Polynésienne de Rugby-Tahiti (FPR). The season was originally supposed to run from 7 March to 27 June, but due to COVID-19 pandemic in Tahiti, the season began on 9 July. Due to concerns of spreading the coronavirus, the season has been officially suspended on 9 August, with Faa’a being the top team on the standings table.

Teams

Number of teams by regions
All teams this season are from Papeete or suburbs of the Papeete Urban Area.

Competition format
The top four teams at the end of the regular season (after all the teams played one another twice.) enter a knockout stage to decide the Champions of Tahiti.  This consists of two rounds. The semi-finals, with the losers meeting for 3rd place and with the winners meeting in the final. All matches are held at the Stade Fautaua in Pirae.

Since as far back as 2015, Tahiti's bonus point system operates as follows:

 4 points for a win.
 2 points for a draw.
 1 point for a loss.
 No point for a forfeit.
 1 bonus point for scoring at least 4 tries (or more).
 1 bonus point for losing by 7 points (or fewer).

Table

<noinclude>

References

Tahiti
Rugby union in Tahiti
Tahiti